

The Gadfly HDW.1 (also known as the Thruxton Gadfly) is a 1960s British two-seat cabin autogyro.

Design and construction
The autogyro was designed by E. Smith and built by the Gadfly Aircraft Company Limited. It is of welded steel tube construction with tricycle landing gear, powered by a 165 hp (123 kW) Rolls-Royce Continental IO-346-A inline piston engine driving a pusher propeller. It has a two-bladed rotor that can be engine-driven for starting.

It was completed at Andover in 1967 and registered G-AVKE. After retirement the Gadfly was initially exhibited at the Historic Aircraft Museum at Southend Airport. Latterly it has been displayed at The Helicopter Museum, Weston-super-Mare.

Specifications

See also

References

Notes

Bibliography

}

1960s British civil utility aircraft
Single-engined pusher autogyros